Teruko (written: , ,  or ) is a feminine Japanese given name. Notable people with the name include:

, Empress of Japan
Akai Teruko (赤井輝子, 1514 – 1594), female samurai warrior. 
, Japanese princess and artist
, Japanese scientist
, Japanese basketball player
, Japanese long-distance runner
, Japanese lawyer and President of the Girl Scouts of Japan
, Japanese artist

Japanese feminine given names